Kim Dae-Hwan  (born January 1, 1976) is a South Korean football player who since 1998 has played for Suwon Samsung Bluewings.

References

External links 
 

1976 births
Living people
South Korean footballers
K League 1 players
Suwon Samsung Bluewings players
Korean Police FC (Semi-professional) players
Hanyang University alumni
Association football goalkeepers